In quantum chemistry, electronic structure is the state of motion of electrons in an electrostatic field created by stationary nuclei. The term encompasses both the wave functions of the electrons and the energies associated with them.  Electronic structure is obtained by solving quantum mechanical equations for the aforementioned clamped-nuclei problem.

Electronic structure problems arise from the Born–Oppenheimer approximation.  Along with nuclear dynamics, the electronic structure problem is one of the two steps in studying the quantum mechanical motion of a molecular system.  Except for a small number of simple problems such as hydrogen-like atoms, the solution of electronic structure problems require modern computers.

Electronic structure problem is routinely solved with quantum chemistry computer programs.  Electronic structure calculations rank among the most computationally intensive tasks in all scientific calculations.  For this reason, quantum chemistry calculations take up significant shares on many scientific supercomputer facilities.

A number of methods to obtain electronic structures exist and their applicability varies from case to case.

See also 
Born–Oppenheimer approximation
Schrödinger equation
Quantum chemistry computer programs

References 

Electronic structure methods